is a Japanese badminton player. She competed in women's doubles at the 1992 Summer Olympics in Barcelona.

References

External links

1969 births
Living people
Japanese female badminton players
Olympic badminton players of Japan
Badminton players at the 1992 Summer Olympics
Asian Games medalists in badminton
Badminton players at the 1990 Asian Games
Badminton players at the 1994 Asian Games
Asian Games bronze medalists for Japan
Medalists at the 1990 Asian Games
Medalists at the 1994 Asian Games